Captain William Evelyn Denison DL, JP (25 February 1843 – 24 September 1916) was a British Army officer and a Conservative Party politician. He owned an estate in Ossington, Nottinghamshire where he held several local offices as well as sitting in the House of Commons from 1874 to 1880.

Early life 
Denison was the eldest son of Sir William T. Denison (1804–71), a British colonial governor and brother of Speaker Evelyn Denison. His mother was Caroline née Hornby, daughter of Admiral Sir Phipps Hornby. At the age of 3 he moved to Van Diemen's Land, where his father had been appointed Lieutenant-Governor. In 1854 Sir William was promoted to Governor of New South Wales, and the family moved to Sydney.

William was educated at Eton and then at the Royal Military Academy in Woolwich. In February 1864 he was commissioned as a lieutenant in the Royal Artillery, and in September 1876 he was promoted to the rank of captain. He retired from the Royal Artillery in 1878.

Political career 
Denison was elected at the 1874 general election as a Member of Parliament (MP) for Nottingham, when the Conservatives took both the city's parliamentary seats from the Liberals. Denison did not stand again in Nottingham at the 1880 general election, having been asked instead to contest the Northern division of Nottinghamshire, where he was unsuccessful.

He was appointed as Deputy Lieutenant of Nottinghamshire in March 1875. He was nominated as a High Sheriff of Nottinghamshire in November 1892, and again in November 1894, and appointed to the post in March 1895.

Denison was also a county magistrate (Justice of the Peace), chairman of the bench of magistrates at Newark, and an Alderman of Nottinghamshire County Council.

Cricket 
Denison was a member of the Nottinghamshire County Cricket Club, of which he was president in 1891. The following year he was president of the Marylebone Cricket Club.

Residence 
When his uncle Viscount Ossington died childless in 1873, Denison inherited the Ossington Hall estate. On his own death in 1916, the estates passed to his son William Frank Evelyn Denison, who died two years later, when the estates reverted to Lady Elinor Denison, widow of W.E Denison.

References

External links 

1843 births
1916 deaths
Conservative Party (UK) MPs for English constituencies
UK MPs 1874–1880
People educated at Eton College
Graduates of the Royal Military Academy, Woolwich
Royal Artillery officers
Deputy Lieutenants of Nottinghamshire
High Sheriffs of Nottinghamshire
People from Newark and Sherwood (district)
Members of Nottinghamshire County Council
Presidents of the Marylebone Cricket Club